Church Manor Way Halt was a halt station in south-east London, between  and  on the North Kent Line of the South Eastern and Chatham Railway.

It was  built to serve munitions workers at Woolwich Arsenal during the First World War. It was opened in 1917 and closed in 1920. The halt was named Church Manor Way after the road in which it was situated.

References

Disused railway stations in the Royal Borough of Greenwich
Former South Eastern Railway (UK) stations
Railway stations in Great Britain opened in 1917
Railway stations in Great Britain closed in 1920